Poove Unakkaga is a 1996 Indian Tamil-language romantic comedy film written and directed by Vikraman. The film stars Vijay and Sangita. Actor Murali makes a guest appearance in a song in the film. The film released on 18 February 1996. The film received critical acclaim and it was the first blockbuster and a major breakthrough in Vijay's career in the Tamil film industry. The movie ran over 250 days in theatres at the time of release. The film was remade in Telugu as Subhakankshalu (1997), in Kannada as Ee Hrudaya Ninagagi (1997) and in Hindi as Badhaai Ho Badhaai (2002).

Plot

Sadasivam and Stephen were family friends for generations until the time when Sadhasivam's daughter Janaki falls in love with Stephen's son Robert. The couple elope and get married against both families' wishes which leads both families to abandon them. Also enmity is created between the two families and they hate each other. Vasudevan is the son of Sadhasivam and Moses  is the son of Stephen.

After 25 years, both the families receive a letter from Raja, who is born to Robert and Janaki and who is also visiting the families. Both the families get furious seeing the letter and they decide not to permit him to stay in their homes. Raja comes to the town along with his friend Gopi but is shocked that he is not allowed inside both the houses. Also Vasudevan and Moses ask the entire street to not let any house for rent to Raja and Gopi. Velangiri lives along with his wife and he permits Raja to stay in his house.

Though Sadhasivam and Stephen do not welcome Raja, but still they long to see their grandson from far. Same is the case with their wives Vijayakumari and Sukumari. Raja understands that only Vasudevan and Moses who are still angry while the other family members just pretend to be angry. So he decides to unite the family. He gets close with his grandparents slowly. Vijayakumari and Sukumari wanted to get Raja married. To escape, Raja lies that he is already married to a girl named Nirmala Mary aka Nimmy.

To Raja's shock, suddenly one day, Nirmala arrives at Velangiri's home introducing herself as the wife of Raja. Raja gets confused and he cannot reveal the truth as that would further disturb the proceedings. Nirmala plays pranks on Raja and Gopi, which always irritates them. One day, Raja plans to make love with Nirmala, so that she will reveal her true identity. Nirmala reveals that she is the only child and daughter named Priyadarshini aka Priya born to Robert and Janaki. She also says that the only man who stays in touch with her family in the town is Velangiri from whom they get frequent updates about the happenings. Now Priyadarshini questions Raja's intention about trying to unite both the families.

Raja reveals a flashback. Raja is an orphan who lives along with his friend Gopi in Chennai. Next to his house, there is a girls’ hostel. Nandhini is the daughter of Vasudevan and she stays in the hostel. Raja gets attracted seeing Nandhini and befriends her. Slowly friendship blossoms into love for Raja. When he is about to convey his love, Raja gets shocked to know that Nandhini is already in love with Lawrence, who is the son of Moses. As there is enmity between the two families, already the couple fears whether their love would be accepted by their family members.

Raja on knowing about the problem, decides to help the couple unite with the approval of their family members. Raja takes the responsibility of convincing both the families and disguises himself as the son born to Robert and Janaki. Priya gets surprised knowing Raja's intention of getting the family united despite knowing the fact that Nandhini is in love with Lawrence. Priya gets attracted towards Raja and starts loving him but does not express it.

Meanwhile, both the families get to know that Nandhini and Lawrence are in love and they get furious again. But Raja takes the couple somewhere and brings them back after a few hours. But Nandhini gets converted to Christianity while Lawrence gets converted to Hinduism. Raja makes the family members realize that love is eternal and it knows no religion/caste etc. Both the families get convinced listening to Raja's words and they agree for the wedding between Lawrence and Nandhini.

On the day of wedding, both Robert and Janaki arrive and the family members happily welcome them and they also apologize for keeping them away for 25 years. Both the families mention that it was their son Raja, who was responsible for reuniting the families. Robert and Janaki get surprised and reveal that they have only one child, which is a daughter named Priyadarshini. Priya reveals that Raja is the friend of Nandhini and he has come to unite the family so that they can get married.  Both the families feel proud seeing Raja and they suggest getting Priya married to Raja. But Raja denies saying that he already had an unsuccessful love story and he can never fall in love again with one more girl. The movie ends with Raja leaving the house and walking alone.

Cast

Soundtrack

The music was composed by S. A. Rajkumar while lyrics were written by Vaali, Palani Bharathi and S. A. Rajkumar. All songs were mega hits.

Reception
Ananda Vikatan rated the film 43 out of 100.

References

External links
 

Tamil films remade in other languages
1996 films
Indian romantic comedy films
1996 romantic comedy films
1990s Tamil-language films
Films scored by S. A. Rajkumar
Films about families
Films about feuds
Super Good Films films